Flemming Ladefoged Hansen (September 11, 1948 – July 14, 2013) was a Danish handball player who competed in the 1972 Summer Olympics.

He played his club handball with Fredericia KFUM, and was the top goalscorer of the 1971, 1972, 1973, 1974, 1975, and 1976 Danish Handball League seasons. In 1972 he was part of the Denmark men's national handball team which finished thirteenth in the Olympic tournament. He played all five matches and scored 27 goals.

References

1948 births
2013 deaths
Danish male handball players
Olympic handball players of Denmark
Handball players at the 1972 Summer Olympics